This Road is the third studio album by Australian country musician James Blundell, which was released in April 1992 by EMI. The album debuted at number four on the ARIA Albums Chart and became Blundell's highest-charting album. It was certified platinum by the Australian Recording Industry Association for shipments of more than 70,000 copies. This Road provided three singles, a duet with James Reyne for their cover version of "Way Out West" (March 1992), the title track (June) and "Down on the Farm" (August).

At the 1993 ARIA Music Awards, This Road was nominated for Best Country Album. At the 1993 Country Music Awards, it won Top Selling album of the Year.

Background 

Australian country musician James Blundell recorded his third studio album, This Road in 1991. Before it appeared he issued a duet single, with James Reyne, covering the Dingoes' song "Way Out West" in March 1992. It peaked at No. 2 on the ARIA Singles chart in April. He reflected on its impact on his career, "I had six or seven years hard work before then. Now the venues are gradually getting bigger and the audience is broadening." The album was released on 3 April via EMI, which was co-produced by Reyne with Garth Porter. It reached No. 4 on the ARIA charts. It was certified platinum by the Australian Recording Industry Association (ARIA) for shipments of more than 70,000 copies by the end of that year. Two further singles appeared from the album, "This Road" (June) and "Down on the Farm" (August). The latter is an ode to Rebecca Williams, whom he had met when he was 16 ( 1980) and in 2020 they became engaged.

Track listing

Charts

Weekly charts

Year-end charts

Certifications

Release history

References

James Blundell (singer) albums
1992 albums
Albums produced by Garth Porter